Luzia Zberg (born 18 January 1970 in Altdorf, Uri) is a retired racing cyclist from Switzerland. She represented her native country at the 1992 Summer Olympics in Barcelona, Spain, finishing in 8th place in the women's individual road race. Her biggest achievements were winning four national titles in the women's road race (1991, 1992, 1993, and 1994), and two in the women's individual time trial (1994 and 1995).

References

External links

1970 births
Living people
Swiss female cyclists
Cyclists at the 1992 Summer Olympics
Olympic cyclists of Switzerland
People from the canton of Uri